The 2015–16 Alaska Aces season was the 30th season of the franchise in the Philippine Basketball Association (PBA).

Key dates

2015
August 23: The 2015 PBA draft took place in Midtown Atrium, Robinson Place Manila.

Draft picks

Roster

  also serves as Alaska's board governor.

Philippine Cup

Eliminations

Standings

Playoffs

Bracket

Commissioner's Cup

Eliminations

Standings

Game log

Playoffs

Bracket

Governors' Cup

Eliminations

Standings

Bracket

Transactions

Trades

Governors' Cup

Recruited imports

References

Alaska Aces (PBA) seasons
Alaska